Arley de Queroz Sandim (born May 25, 1986) is a former Brazilian football player.

Playing career
He played for J2 League club Sagan Tosu in 2005 season. On August 2, he debuted in J2 League against Kyoto Purple Sanga. He played 5 matches for the club in 2005 season and he left the club end of the season.

Club statistics

References

External links

J. League

1986 births
Living people
Brazilian footballers
J2 League players
Sagan Tosu players
Brazilian expatriate footballers
Expatriate footballers in Japan
Association football forwards